Eriochilus magenteus, commonly known as the magenta autumn orchid, is a plant in the orchid family Orchidaceae and is endemic to south eastern Australia. It is a slender ground orchid with a single leaf and one or two small, bright pink to magenta flowers. It is only found in higher areas of the Australian Capital Territory, southern New South Wales and north-eastern Victoria.

Description
Eriochilus cucullatus is a terrestrial,  perennial, deciduous, herb with an underground tuber. Flowering occurs from December to March.

Taxonomy and naming
Eriochilus magenteus was first formally described in 2008 by David Jones and the description was published in The Orchadian.

Distribution and habitat
The magenta autumn orchid grows in moist soil in alpine meadows with grasses and sedges, sometimes near swamps and streams. It is found in the Australian Capital Territory, southern New South Wales and north-eastern Victoria.

References 

magenteus
Plants described in 2008
Endemic orchids of Australia
Orchids of Australia